Clarissa Maria Dougall ( Young; December 10, 1849 – April 30, 1935) was a Utah suffragist and a member of the general presidency of what is today the Young Women organization of the Church of Jesus Christ of Latter-day Saints (LDS Church).

Maria Young was born in Salt Lake City to Brigham Young and his eighth wife, Clarissa Ross. When she was eight years old, her mother Clarissa died, so from that point forward she was raised by Zina D. H. Young, another of Brigham Young's wives.

Maria Young married William B. Dougall on June 1, 1868. She was at the foundational meeting of the LDS Church's Young Ladies' Department of the Cooperative Retrenchment Association in 1869. When Margaret Young Taylor, the first counselor in the Young Women organization, resigned her position in 1887 after the death of her husband, Dougall was selected to succeed Taylor. Dougall was the first counselor to Elmina Shepard Taylor from 1887 until Taylor's death on 6 December 1904. For many years, the meetings of the presidency of the Young Women was held in Dougall's home in Salt Lake City. When the Salt Lake Temple opened in 1893, Dougall became an ordinance worker.

After Utah gained statehood in 1896, Dougall was the chairperson of the Utah chapter of the National Council of Women, a suffrage organization led by Susan B. Anthony; in 1897 Dougall attended the NCW's large suffrage convention in Washington, D.C. Dougall was also a founding member and first counselor to Annie Taylor Hyde of the Daughters of Utah Pioneers organization.

Dougall died in Salt Lake City of a coronary occlusion. She was the mother of three children.

See also
Descendants of Brigham Young

Notes

References 
 

1849 births
1935 deaths
19th-century American people
19th-century American women
20th-century American people
20th-century American women
American leaders of the Church of Jesus Christ of Latter-day Saints
American suffragists
Burials at Salt Lake City Cemetery
Children of Brigham Young
Counselors in the General Presidency of the Young Women (organization)
Latter Day Saints from Utah
Mormon feminists
People from Salt Lake City
Presidents of Daughters of Utah Pioneers
Richards–Young family